David Walsh (born 29 April 1979) is a Welsh former footballer, who played as a goalkeeper for Wrexham, Rhyl and Caernarfon Town.

Career

Having came up from Wrexham's youth system, Walsh signed his first professional contract with the club in 1997. Usually acting as back-up, he mostly got games in the FAW Welsh Cup during his early years. Making a few league appearances as back-up to Kevin Dearden, Walsh was loaned out to League Of Wales side Rhyl in 2001.

Walsh was released by Wrexham in May 2002. After appearing in a friendly for Shrewsbury Town in pre-season, and with various other clubs, including Rushden & Diamonds, Tranmere Rovers and Hereford United, Walsh was ultimately left without a club until being signed by Welsh Premier League side Caernarfon Town in 2004.

Career statistics

References 

Living people
Welsh footballers
Association football goalkeepers
Rhyl F.C. players
Caernarfon Town F.C. players
1979 births
Footballers from Wrexham
Wrexham A.F.C. players
English Football League players
Cymru Premier players